Ryu Hwa-young (born April 22, 1993), better known by the mononym Hwayoung, is a South Korean actress and singer. She is a former member of South Korean girl group T-ara.

Biography 
Ryu Hwa-young was born on April 22, 1993 in Gwangju, South Korea. Her older twin sister, Ryu Hyo-young, is also a rapper and former member of the group Coed School and its sub-group F-ve Dolls.

Ryu Hyo-young and Ryu Hwa-young made a guest appearance on SBS's variety show Star King in May 2010. They were both subsequently scouted and recruited by Core Contents Media.

Career

2010–2012: T-ara and solo activities

Core Contents Media originally slated to add Ryu Hyo-young into T-ara as the seventh member, but she recommended her twin sister, Ryu Hwa-young. In July 2010, it was announced that Ryu Hwa-young would be added into T-ara as lead rapper while her sister would be debuting in the newly formed Coed School. She began promotions as part of T-ara in November 2010 by appearing on the third season of Hello Baby and promoting their first mini album Temptastic. T-ara held their first performance with Ryu on December 3, through KBS's Music Bank. During her time in the group, she participated in the collaboration between Davichi and T-ara for "We Were In Love" in December 2011. She also participated in the writing of the rap lyrics of "Love is All the Same" by fellow labelmate Yangpa. 
 
On July 30, 2012, it was revealed Ryu would no longer be a member of T-ara. Despite rumours of a possible return to T-ara, Ryu announced that she would be returning to the music industry with a new image. On September 10, Ryu later participated in the hip-hop and rap event "Open Freestyle Day 2012", announcing that she was looking forward to studying music and eventually returning to the industry.

2014–present: Acting career
On December 15, it was announced that Ryu signed an exclusive contract with Wellmade Yedang and was preparing to debut as an actress. On December 31, Ryu made an appearance at the "2014 Miller Countdown Party" as a DJ, alongside DJ Koo, Park Myung-soo and TATA, becoming the youngest female DJ to ever participate in the event.

Ryu debuted as an actress in the two-episode drama special Mother's Choice. She successfully made a transition into acting after receiving praise for her roles in tvN's romantic comedy Ex-Girlfriends' Club and JTBC's coming-of-age drama Hello, My Twenties!. In 2017, she was a part of the ensemble cast for weekend drama My Father is Strange. She was then cast in her first leading role in KBS's crime drama Mad Dog.

On June 24, 2020, it was announced that Ryu signed a new contract with Polaris Entertainment.Later on September 13, 2021, Ryu terminated her contract with Polaris Entertainment.

On December 9, 2021, Ryu signed a contract with Never Die Entertainment.

Controversies

Inkigayo Wardrobe malfunction scandal

Bullying and legal issues
On July 28, 2012, several members of T-ara posted tweets that were purportedly seen to be derisive references to Ryu. An official announcement regarding these tweets and a "major announcement about T-ara" was made July 30, which revealed Ryu would no longer be a member of the group. Following the announcement of her abrupt contract termination with Core Contents Media, rumors of her experiencing severe bullying by other members of T-ara surfaced throughout the web and the media, which sparked intensive public interest and controversy. Some members of the public strongly believed that Ryu was mistreated by the other members of T-ara and her agency, and an outcry by T-ara's fan community led to the scheduling of a shut down, as well as the suspension of the members' activities, resulting in a huge blow to the group's popularity.

In 2017, a former T-ara staff member claimed that Ryu and her sister Ryu Hyo-young were the actual bullies in the scandal that plagued T-ara in 2012. Soon afterwards, more staffers came forwards with accounts that Ryu had been disrespectful to the other members as well as stylists, and claimed she had faked how severe an injury was in order to get more sympathy. Ryu initially denied the rumors, but later admitted parts were true. Following intense backlash, including a flood of negative messages on her social media and a reduction of her role in Hello, My Twenties! 2 to a cameo, Ryu deleted her Instagram account.

Discography

Filmography

Film

Television series

Variety show

Awards and nominations

References

External links

 
 

1993 births
Living people
People from Gwangju
MBK Entertainment artists
South Korean twins
Twin musicians
South Korean women pop singers
South Korean film actresses
South Korean television actresses
South Korean television personalities
South Korean female idols
Japanese-language singers of South Korea
T-ara members
K-pop singers